Hugo Lemos Arthuso (born 4 May 1987) is a Brazilian male badminton player. He competed at the Pan American Games in 2011 and 2015.

Career
In 2011, he became the champion at the Bill Graham Miami International tournament in men's doubles event with Daniel Paiola. He also won the Suriname International tournament in mixed doubles event partnered with Fabiana Silva. In 2015, he won the silver medal in men's doubles event at the Toronto Pan American Games partnered with Daniel Paiola.

Achievements

Pan American Games
Men's Doubles

Pan Am Championships
Men's Doubles

Mixed Doubles

South American Games
Men's Singles

Mixed Doubles

BWF International Challenge/Series
Men's Doubles

Mixed Doubles

 BWF International Challenge tournament
 BWF International Series tournament
 BWF Future Series tournament

References

External links 
 
 
 Confederação Brasileira de Badminton Atleta

Living people
1987 births
People from Osasco
Sportspeople from São Paulo
Brazilian male badminton players
Badminton players at the 2011 Pan American Games
Badminton players at the 2015 Pan American Games
Pan American Games silver medalists for Brazil
Pan American Games medalists in badminton
South American Games silver medalists for Brazil
South American Games bronze medalists for Brazil
South American Games medalists in badminton
Competitors at the 2010 South American Games
Medalists at the 2015 Pan American Games
20th-century Brazilian people
21st-century Brazilian people